Porto Velho Air Force Base – ALA6  is a base of the Brazilian Air Force, located in Porto Velho, Brazil.

It shares some facilities with Gov. Jorge Teixeira de Oliveira International Airport.

History
Porto Velho Air Force Base was commissioned on 31 October 1984.

Units
The following units are based at Porto Velho Air Force Base:
 2nd Squadron of the 3rd Aviation Group (2º/3ºGAv) Grifo, using the A-29A & B Super Tucano.   
 2nd Squadron of the 8th Aviation Group (2°/8°GAv) Poti, using the Mil AH-2 Sabre. In August 2022 it was announced that all 12 aircraft will be decommissioned and stored.
 5th Squadron of the 1st Communications and Control Group (5º/1ºGCC) Zagal, using radars and equipment for air defense.

Access
The base is located 7 km from downtown Porto Velho.

Gallery
This gallery displays aircraft that are or have been based at Porto Velho. The gallery is not comprehensive.

Present aircraft

Retired aircraft

See also
List of Brazilian military bases
Governador Jorge Teixeira de Oliveira International Airport

References

External links

Rondônia
Brazilian Air Force
Brazilian Air Force bases
Buildings and structures in Rondônia
Porto Velho